Stanislav Sazonovich (born 6 March 1992) is a Belarusian professional footballer who plays for Arsenal Dzerzhinsk.

References

External links
 
 
 Profile at Gomel website

1992 births
Living people
Belarusian footballers
Association football defenders
FC Gomel players
FC Energetik-BGU Minsk players
FC Rechitsa-2014 players
FC Naftan Novopolotsk players
FC Smolevichi players
FC Gorodeya players
FC Belshina Bobruisk players
FC Arsenal Dzerzhinsk players